Oreste Pinto (9 October 1889 in Amsterdam, the Netherlands – 18 September 1961 in London, England) was a Dutch counterintelligence officer and Lieutenant-Colonel. His activities during the Second World War, in which he worked with MI5 interrogating refugees to England, resulted in the capture of eight spies.

Career

During the Second World War, Pinto was an MI5 interrogator. He interviewed over 30,000 immigrants to the UK at the euphemistically named "London Reception Centre" in the Royal Victoria Patriotic Building in Wandsworth.

In 1952, Pinto published two books, Spy-catcher and Friend or Foe?  These formed the basis of the 1959-1961 BBC television series Spycatcher, and  also an earlier BBC Radio series, in both of which he was portrayed by Bernard Archard. A further book, Spycatcher 2, based on the series, was published in 1960. The 1962 Dutch programme De Fuik, in which Pinto was portrayed by Frits Butzelaar, was also derived from them.

Dwight Eisenhower once described Pinto as "the greatest living authority on security". The Daily Telegraph referred to him as a "human bloodhound".  Conversely, Guy Liddell stated in 1942 that he had been told that Pinto had "a thoroughly bad record".

Pinto's career in intelligence began in 1913, when he was recruited by the Deuxième Bureau.

He characterized himself as basically a generalist, with a knack for learning languages, skill in boxing and shooting ("I managed to reach amateur international standard,"), and being an excellent bridge player and a "local" zoologist.

Works

 Spycatcher. Werner Laurie, 1952
 Friend or Foe? Werner Laurie, 1953
 Spycatcher 2. Four Square, 1963
 Spycatcher 3. Four Square, 1967

References

External links

TIME review of Pinto's memoirs

1889 births
1961 deaths
Dutch spies
Dutch Sephardi Jews
University of Paris alumni
MI5 personnel
Military personnel from Amsterdam